The , sometimes called the Nigawa Botanical Garden, is a botanical garden located at 6-14-15 Nigawa-cho, Nishinomiya, Hyōgo, Japan. The garden is next to Kabutoyama Forest Park at Mount Kabutoyama, and contains a greenhouse, flower collections, and cherry trees.

See also 
 List of botanical gardens in Japan

References 
 Kitayama Botanical Garden (Japanese)
 Kansai Time Out article
 Natural Parks, Botanical Gardens, etc. in the Hanshin Area
 Cherry Blossom Spots in Arima and Kobe
 Yellow Pages Japan

Nishinomiya
Botanical gardens in Japan
Gardens in Hyōgo Prefecture